Louis IV de Bueil, Comte de Sancerre (died c. 1565) was the Count of Sancerre from 1537 until his death. Great cup-bearer of the king of France, Knight of the Order of King, Count of Sancerre (1537-1563), governor of Anjou, Touraine and Maine . He commanded the French defenders during the Siege of St. Dizier (1544). He fought at Battle of Marignano, Battle of Pavia, Battle of St. Quentin (1557) .

Counts of Sancerre
Military leaders of the Italian Wars